Marc Miralles Portillo (born 14 November 1997) is a Spanish field hockey player who plays as a midfielder for División de Honor club Real Club de Polo and the Spain national team.

Club career
In the Spanish División de Honor, Miralles played for CD Terrassa until 2020. In June 2020 it was announced he would move to Real Club de Polo in Barcelona.

International career

Under–21
In 2017, Miralles was a member of the Spanish under-21 team at the EuroHockey Junior Championship in Valencia. Spain finished in equal third place at the tournament, after sickness among the Spanish team forced the cancellation of the bronze medal match.

Senior national team
Miralles made his debut for Los Redsticks in 2018, during a test series against Wales in Terrassa. In 2021, Miralles made his first appearance at a major tournament, representing the team at the EuroHockey Championships in Amsterdam. Miralles was named as a co-captain of the team in 2022, when the squad for season three of the FIH Pro League was announced. He made his World Cup debut at the 2023 Men's FIH Hockey World Cup.

References

External links
 
 

1997 births
Living people
Male field hockey midfielders
Spanish male field hockey players
División de Honor de Hockey Hierba players
Real Club de Polo de Barcelona players
2023 Men's FIH Hockey World Cup players
21st-century Spanish people
Place of birth missing (living people)